Myer Nussbaum (March 10, 1855 in Albany, New York – September 23, 1952 in New York City) was an American lawyer and politician from New York.

Life
He was the son of Solomon Nussbaum (1806–1879) and Clara Nussbaum (1816–1898), German Jewish emigrants from Neustadt an der Saale. He attended the public schools. He graduated from Albany Law School in 1877, was admitted to the bar, and practiced in Albany. In 1884, he was appointed as a police justice. He married Lillian Van Kuren. The marriage ended in divorce before 1902.

He was a member of the New York State Assembly (Albany Co., 3rd D.) in 1893; and a member of the New York State Senate (29th D.) from 1896 to 1898, sitting in the 119th, 120th and 121st New York State Legislatures.

On May 28, 1900, he was appointed as referee to hear testimony relating to the business of the American Ice Company, an ice trust which the State authorities wanted to break up. Afterwards he remained in New York City, and practiced law there.

On February 13, 1915, he was appointed as referee to hear testimony to "determine whether the increased prices of bread, flour and wheat have been due to criminal conspiracy."

He was buried at the Beth Emeth Cemetery in Glenmont.

Sources
 The New York Red Book compiled by Edgar L. Murlin (published by James B. Lyon, Albany NY, 1897; pg. 164f, 404 and 510)
 New York State Legislative Souvenir for 1893 with Portraits of the Members of Both Houses by Henry P. Phelps (pg. 47 and 49)
 STATE WAR ON ICE TRUST in NYT on May 29, 1900
 ALIMONY FOR MRS. WILSON in NYT on March 23, 1907
 STATE TO EXPOSE BREAD CONSPIRACY on February 14, 1915
 NUSSBAUM, MYER in the Jewish Encyclopedia

External links

1855 births
1952 deaths
Republican Party New York (state) state senators
Politicians from Albany, New York
Republican Party members of the New York State Assembly
Jewish American state legislators in New York (state)
Albany Law School alumni
Lawyers from Albany, New York